Subhalekha is a 1982 Telugu-language comedy-drama film, produced by Allu Aravind and V. V. Sastry under the Prasanthi Creations banner and directed by K. Viswanath. It stars Chiranjeevi and Sumalata , with music composed by K. V. Mahadevan. The film was recorded as a Super Hit at the box office.

It was the first time they worked together; after this success, they went on to make two more movies: Swayamkrushi in 1987 and Aapadbandhavudu in 1992. The film was made at a time when Chiranjeevi had started getting lead actor roles and followed the immensely successful film Intlo Ramayya Veedilo Krishnayya. After making Saptapadi, in which he dealt with the social stigma of the caste system, K. Viswanath followed up with this film in which he dealt with the social malady of the dowry system and is inspired by famous writer Gurazada Venkata Apparao's work Kanyasulkam. The film is the debut of famous actor Subhalekha Sudhakar, his character in the film became so popular that after that, he has been credited with this feature title before his name.

Plot
Narasimha Murthy (Chiranjeevi) is a multi-talented person who works as a waiter in a star hotel, (filming location: Dolphin Hotel, Visakhapatnam) since he is unable to pass his B.A. exams. He meets Sujatha (Sumalata), a lecturer who works in a college run by councilor Ankella Adiseshayya (Satyanarayana). Mohan (Girish), who is an engineer and elder son of Adiseshayya, comes to Sujatha's place with his father for a marriage proposal. During this, Sujata stands up and has an argument with Adiseshayya when the latter demands exorbitant amounts as dowry. This creates a rift between Sujata and her parents who fear that this act of Sujatha might ostracize them from society. Adiseshayya also dismisses Sujatha from her job.

During this difficult phase, Murthy, as a friend, provides solace to Sujatha; their relationship is mistaken as an affair and Sujatha is forced to leave her home. Murthy creates a big ruckus during the felicitation function of Adiseshayya and humiliates him. Adiseshayya retaliates by hiring goons to beat up Murthy and also gets him dismissed from his job.

Left with no choice, Murti takes Sujatha to Hyderabad and meets Rao (Arun), whom he had met during the latter's stay in the hotel where Murti worked. Rao, who is in a senior post in Allwyn, hires Sujatha. Back home, Lakshmi (Tulasi), younger sister of Sujatha, falls in love with Murali (Subhalekha Sudhakar), who is the younger son of Adiseshayya. Murali threatens his father with suicide and forces his father to let him marry Lakshmi. Left without a choice, Adiseshayya, who had dreamed of getting a lot of dowries since his son is a doctor accepts the proposal with the very little dowry. After marriage, Lakshmi leaves to Sujatha's place where Murthy arranges for a marriage between Sujatha and Rao. Lakshmi, with consent from her husband, files a suit against Adiseshayya to surrender his son, Murali to her since she paid for him during her marriage to teach Adiseshayya a lesson. Seeing this notice, Adiseshayya, his son, and Lakshmi's parents come to Hyderabad just before Sujatha's marriage. The climax deals with how Adiseshayya is taught a lesson and also ends with the marriage of Murthy and Sujata as per the wishes of the latter. Adiseshayya returns home to find that his elder son Mohan had married the widowed cousin of Murthy.

Cast

 Chiranjeevi as Narasimha Murthy
 Sumalata as Sujatha
 Satyanarayana as Ankella Adiseshayya
 Allu Ramalingaiah as Lawyer Chillara Bhavani Sankaram 
 Ramana Murthy as Jagannatham
 Sudhakar as Murali 
 Rallapalli as Gurnadham
 Sakshi Ranga Rao as Bhavanarayana
 Girish as Mohan
 Arun as Rao
 Potti Prasad as Server Subba Rao 
 Vankayala Satyanarayana as Principal Challeswara Rao
 Hemasundar as Hotel Properter Bhatt
 C.H.Krishnamurthy as Srinivasa Rao
 Jeet Mohan Mitra as Kesava Rao
 Krishna Chaitanya
 Dham as Peon
 Tulasi as Lakshmi 
 Pushpakumari as Sujatha's mother
 Anupama as Satyavathi 
 Malini
 Nirmalamma as Narasimha Murthy's grandmother

Crew
 Dialogues: Gollapudi Maruti Rao 
 Lyrics: Veturi and Annamayya
 Music: K. V. Mahadevan
 Playback singers: S. P. Balasubrahmanyam, S. Janaki, P. Susheela, S. P. Sailaja & Poornachander Rao
 Choreographer: Parupalli Seshu
 Assistant Music Director: Puhalendi
 Art: Thota Tharani
 Cinematography: Lok Singh
 Editor: G. G. Krishna Rao
 Producers:Allu Aravind & V. V. Sastry
 Story - Screenplay - Director: K. Viswanath
 Production Company: Prasanthi Creations
 DVD release: S.V. Entertainments

Soundtrack

Music was composed by K. V. Mahadevan. Music was released on SAREGAMA Audio Company.

Awards
 Filmfare Awards

|-
| 1982
| Chiranjeevi (for 1st time)
| Filmfare Award for Best Telugu Actor
| 
|- 
| 1982
| K. Viswanath
| Filmfare Award for Best Director – Telugu
| 
|}

Nandi Awards
 1982 - Nandi Award for Best Story Writer - K. Viswanath

Reception
 The movie was very well received by both critics and audiences and did very well at the box office and perhaps would have done even better if it had been released a bit later: It was released within five weeks of Intlo Ramayya Veedilo Krishnayya which was running very successfully at that time.
 Was remade into Hindi as Shubh Kaamna (1983) by actor Rakesh Roshan who played the role played by Chiranjeevi in the direction of K. Viswanath. Rakesh Roshan had earlier remade Subhodayam into Hindi as Kaamchor.

References

External links

1980s Telugu-language films
1982 films
Films directed by K. Viswanath
Telugu films remade in other languages
Films scored by K. V. Mahadevan
Geetha Arts films